In mathematics, the Cauchy integral theorem (also known as the Cauchy–Goursat theorem) in complex analysis, named after Augustin-Louis Cauchy (and Édouard Goursat), is an important statement about line integrals for holomorphic functions in the complex plane. Essentially, it says that if  is holomorphic in a simply connected domain Ω, then for any simply closed contour  in Ω, that contour integral is zero.

Statement

Fundamental theorem for complex line integrals 

Formulation on simply connected regions 

Let  be a simply connected open set, and let  be a holomorphic function. Let  be a smooth closed curve. Then:

General formulation 

Let  be an open set, and let  be a holomorphic function. Let  be a smooth closed curve. If   is homotopic to a constant curve, then:

(Recall that a curve is homotopic to a constant curve if there exists a smooth homotopy (within ) from the curve to the constant curve. Intuitively, this means that one can shrink the curve into a point without exiting the space.) The first version is a special case of this because on a simply connected set, every closed curve is homotopic to a constant curve.

Main example 

In both cases, it is important to remember that the curve  does not surround any "holes" in the domain, or else the theorem does not apply. A famous example is the following curve: 

which traces out the unit circle. Here the following integral:

is nonzero. Thus, the theorem does not apply.

Discussion
This is significant because one can then prove Cauchy's integral formula for these functions, and from that deduce these functions are infinitely differentiable.

The condition is crucial; consider

which traces out the unit circle, and then the path integral

The Cauchy integral theorem leads to Cauchy's integral formula and the residue theorem.

Proof
Cauchy provided this proof, but it was later proven by Goursat without requiring techniques from vector calculus, or the continuity of partial derivatives.

We can break the integrand  as well as the differential  into their real and imaginary components:

In this case we have

But as the real and imaginary parts of a function holomorphic in the domain   and  must satisfy the Cauchy–Riemann equations there:

We therefore find that both integrands (and hence their integrals) are zero

This gives the desired result

See also
Morera's theorem
Methods of contour integration
Star domain

References

External links 
 
 
Jeremy Orloff, 18.04 Complex Variables with Applications Spring 2018 Massachusetts Institute of Technology: MIT OpenCourseWare Creative Commons.
Augustin-Louis Cauchy
Theorems in complex analysis